In computing,  is a command found on most Unix-like operating systems, Intel iRMX 86, every Microsoft Windows operating system since Windows Server 2003, and on ReactOS. It is a concatenation of the words "Who am I?" and prints the effective username of the current user when invoked.

Overview

The command has the same effect as the Unix command . On Unix-like operating systems, the output of the command is slightly different from  because  outputs the username that the user is working under, whereas  outputs the username that was used to log in. For example, if the user logged in as John and  into root,  displays  and  displays . This is because the  command does not invoke a login shell by default.

This version was developed by Bill Joy.

The GNU version was written by Richard Mlynarik and is part of the GNU Core Utilities (coreutils).

The command is available as a separate package for Microsoft Windows as part of the GnuWin32 project and the UnxUtils collection of native Win32 ports of common GNU Unix-like utilities.

On Intel iRMX 86 this command lists the currents user's identification and access rights.

The command is also available as part of the Windows 2000 Resource Kit and Windows XP SP2 Support Tools.

The ReactOS version was developed by Ismael Ferreras Morezuelas and is licensed under the GPLv2.

This command was also available as a NetWare-Command residing in the public-directory of the fileserver. It also outputs the current connections to which server the workstation is attached with which username.

Example

Unix, Unix-like
# whoami
root

Intel iRMX 86
--WHOAMI
USER ID: 5
ACCESS ID'S: 5, WORLD

Windows, ReactOS
C:\Users\admin>whoami
workgroup\admin

See also

 
 
 
 User identifiers for Unix
 List of Unix commands

References

Further reading

External links

 
 
 whoami | Microsoft Docs

Unix user management and support-related utilities
ReactOS commands
Windows administration